The 1956 Idaho Vandals football team represented the University of Idaho in the 1956 NCAA University Division football season. The Vandals were led by third-year head coach Skip Stahley and were members of the Pacific Coast Conference. Home games were played on campus at Neale Stadium in Moscow, with one home game in Boise at old Bronco Stadium at Boise Junior College.

Idaho compiled a 4–5 overall record but were 0–4 in the PCC. After four losses to open, the Vandals won three straight, then split the final two games.

After road losses to Washington and Oregon, the Vandals suffered a second straight loss in the Battle of the Palouse with neighbor Washington State, falling  at home on October 6. Following the game, skirmishes between student factions provoked the Moscow city police to use tear gas to control the situation. The following week, Idaho was depleted by injuries and came out on the short end of a 41-point homecoming shutout by Arizona State.

The most recent winning season for Idaho football was 18 years earlier in 1938, and the Vandals were a win shy in 1956. The streak was broken seven years later in 1963.

Notable players
This Vandal team had several players who went on to extended careers in professional football. Jerry Kramer of Sandpoint played eleven seasons at right guard with the Green Bay Packers and won five NFL titles (and the first two Super Bowls) under head coach Vince Lombardi. He was an All-Pro five times and was the lead blocker on the famous Packers sweep. Kramer made the NFL's all-decade team for the 1960s and was the last member of the NFL's 50th anniversary team to be inducted into the Pro Football Hall of Fame, at age 82 in 2018.

Wayne Walker of Boise played fifteen seasons with the Detroit Lions as an outside linebacker and was named All-Pro three times. Both were juniors in 1956 and were selected in the fourth round of the 1958 NFL Draft; Kramer was 39th overall and Walker 45th, and both were periodic placekickers as pros. (As Vandals, Kramer was the kicker and Walker was the long snapper.)

Jim Prestel of Indianapolis was a defensive tackle for eight seasons in the NFL, primarily with the expansion Minnesota Vikings. A sophomore in 1956, he missed most of the following season due to his mother's terminal illness. Selected in the sixth round of the 1959 NFL Draft, 70th overall, he was granted another year of eligibility and played for Idaho in 1959 and began his pro career with the Cleveland Browns in 1960. Prestel was also a standout player on the Vandal basketball team. He played in his final game at Idaho in the Battle of the Palouse in late October with a broken foot, then was sidelined and missed the basketball season.

Schedule

 One game was played on Thursday (Montana at Missoula on Thanksgiving)

All-conference
No Vandals were on the All-PCC team or the second team. Honorable mention were quarterback Gary Johnson, tackle Dick Foster, guard Jerry Kramer, and center Wayne Walker.

NFL Draft
One Vandal was selected in the 1957 NFL Draft:

Five juniors were selected in the 1958 NFL Draft:

One sophomore was selected in the 1959 NFL Draft:

^ Prestel was granted another year of eligibility and played for Idaho in 1959.
List of Idaho Vandals in the NFL Draft

References

External links
Gem of the Mountains: 1957 University of Idaho yearbook – 1956 football season 
Go Mighty Vandals – 1956 football season
Official game program: Idaho at Utah – October 27, 1956
Idaho Argonaut – student newspaper – 1956 editions

Idaho
Idaho Vandals football seasons
Idaho Vandals football